Chemical Watch is a global provider of premium independent intelligence and insight for product safety professionals managing chemicals. Products and services include online news, resources and tools, global conferences, training events, eLearning and analyst services.

Its readership includes businesses, NGOs, service providers and government agencies.

History 
Chemical Watch was established in 2007 in response to the EU Regulation on the Registration, Evaluation, Authorisation and Restriction of Chemicals (REACH) and wider regulatory developments such as the Globally Harmonised System of Classification and Labelling of Chemicals (GHS).

In March 2019 Chemical Watch announced that it was consolidating its three sub-brands (AsiaHub, BiocidesHub and Chemical Risk Manager) into a single Chemical Watch brand alongside a library of resources, diagnostic tools and expert support from a newly formed analyst team. This coincided with the launch of a new brand identity which introduced the 'iris' symbol and tagline: ‘Intelligence to transform product safety’. 

It was announced on 1st December 2020 that Enhesa, the global environmental, health and safety (EHS) compliance intelligence platform backed by CGE Partners (CGE), completed the acquisition of Chemical Watch.

Activities 
In October 2008, the editor of Chemical Watch was invited to chair a stakeholder open day on behalf of the European Chemicals Agency. Chemical Watch has also produced a daily newsletter for delegates at ChemCon events in Kuala Lumpur in 2009 and Prague in 2010.

While engaging with the business, technical and legal communities, Chemical Watch also provides airspace to NGOs and politicians active in the chemicals arena.

Winner of 2018 best series of articles award

In June 2018, Chemical Watch (CW Research Ltd) was awarded 1st place in the 39th Annual SIPAwards competition by The Specialized Information Publishers Association (SIPA) for "Best Series of Articles on Health Care/Regulatory/Education" for its work on Brexit and chemical regulation with the entry 'Brexit – being in the right place at the right time with the right intelligence'.

References

External links 
Chemical Watch

British science websites